Laura Giuliani (born 5 June 1993) is an Italian professional footballer who plays as a goalkeeper for Serie A club AC Milan and the Italy women's national team.

Club career

FCF Como 2000 
In 2009, having finished her youth career for S.S. La Benvenuta, a club located in Bollate, a city to the north-west of Milan, Giuliani moved to Como to take part in the 2009–2010 Serie A2 season. Her debut came on 14 February 2010, against ACF Trento.
She was named on the starting XI for the 2010–2011 season and started all 22 league matches, conceding 15 goals. The team finished even on points with ACF Milan in Group A, as, during the final league match against the rossonere, a late goal handed the win to the Milanese club. At that point, a play-off match was held seven days later, lost at the 94th minute.
Como 2000, however, was later granted access to the Serie A as well when Reggiana withdrew.
Giuliani made her Serie A début on 9 October 2011, against Tavagnacco, and marked 22 appearances out of the 26 league matches, conceding 37 goals as Como finished the season 9th.

FSV Gütersloh 2009 
On 21 September 2012, Giuliani announced she would be moving to German Bundesliga team FSV Gütersloh 2009. She started her first match for the team on 14 November 2012.

1. FC Köln 
Giuliani moved to 1. FC Köln for the 2015–16 season; she started as a backup for Lena Nuding but gradually played more and more games, unable, however, to prevent her team from being demoted.

SC Freiburg 
Before the 2015–16 season ended, with Koln already mathematically relegated to 2. Bundesliga, Giuliani was signed by SC Freiburg, where she constantly was second-choice to Laura Benkarth, only one year older but also already a player for her national team.

Juventus 
She signed for the newly created Juventus team in 2017. Giuliani made her debut for Juventus on 30 September 2017, in a 3–0 win against Orobica. On 20 May 2018, Giuliani won Juventus' first league of their history winning 5–4 after penalty shoot-out against Brescia. On 24 May 2021, Giuliani announced that she would leave Juventus at end of the season.

AC Milan 
On 16 July 2021, Giuliani moved to AC Milan.

International career

Under-19 
Giuliani received her first call-up for the Italian U19 team on 5 March 2011, for a friendly. She made her UEFA début on 30 May 2011, in the 2011 Women's Euro, in the first group stage match against Russia, as Italy reached the semi-finals, where they were knocked out by Norway.
She totalled 19 caps for the U-19 team.

Under-20 
Giuliani made her FIFA début on 19 August 2012, during the first group stage match against Brazil of the U-20 World Cup. Italy drew 1–1 with Brazil and lost the following two matches, leaving them out of the quarter-finals. Giuliani started all three group stage games, conceding seven goals.

Senior 
Giuliani received her first call-up for the senior team as Italy faced Austria in a friendly held on 7 April 2013. She was left out of the squad which took part in the UEFA Women's Euro 2013. She made her debut on 5 April 2014 against Spain in a 2015 FIFA Women's World Cup qualification match.

She started all games for Italy during the 2019 Women's World Cup.

Honours

Club
Juventus
 Serie A: Winner: 2017–18, 2018–19, 2019–20, 2020–21
Coppa Italia: Winner: 2018–19
Supercoppa Italiana: Winner: 2019, 2020

Individual
 AIC Best Women's XI: 2019

References

External links 

 Profile on the FIFA website
 Profile on the Como website
 Profile on the Gütersloh  website

1993 births
Living people
Italian women's footballers
Italy women's international footballers
SC Freiburg (women) players
Italian expatriate sportspeople in Germany
Expatriate women's footballers in Germany
Women's association football goalkeepers
Juventus F.C. (women) players
Serie A (women's football) players
1. FC Köln (women) players
2019 FIFA Women's World Cup players
Footballers from Milan
Frauen-Bundesliga players
FSV Gütersloh 2009 players
S.S.D. F.C. Como Women players
UEFA Women's Euro 2022 players
UEFA Women's Euro 2017 players
21st-century Italian women